The term "edifice complex" was coined in the 1970s to describe Philippine First Lady Imelda Marcos' practice of using publicly funded construction projects as political and election propaganda.

Built with a Brutalist architectural style, perhaps to emphasize their grandiose character, these construction projects were funded by foreign loans, allowing the incumbent Marcos administration to create an impression of progress, but instead put the Philippines through a series of debt crises. The first of the crises occurred in 1970, which many economic historians consider to have triggered the socioeconomic unrest which later led Marcos to impose martial law in 1972.

The expression has also been generalized outside of the context of Imelda and Ferdinand Marcos and the Philippines.

Etymology 
The term is a play on the "Oedipus complex" of psychoanalytic theory.

While earlier use of the term elsewhere in the world has been suggested, the term was independently coined by Behn Cervantes to criticise the construction of the Cultural Center of the Philippines during the buildup to the 1969 presidential election campaign, during which Imelda Marcos' husband Ferdinand Marcos was running for a then-unprecedented second term as President of the Philippines.

Deyan Sudjic, in his 2005 book The Edifice Complex: How the Rich and Powerful Shape the World, generalizes the term, expanding it outside of the context of Marcos and the Philippines.  He writes: There is a psychological parallel between making a mark on the landscape with a building and the exercise of political power. Both depend on the imposition of will.  Certainly, seeing their worldview confirmed by reducing an entire city to the scale of a doll's house in an architectural model has an inherent appeal for those who regard the individual as of no account. ...Architecture feeds the egos of the susceptible.  They grow more and more dependent on it to the point where architecture becomes an end to itself, seducing the addicts as they build more and more on an even larger scale.Building is the means by which the egotism of the individual is expressed in its most naked form: the Edifice Complex. Sudjic goes on to explore many instances of the complex both historically and in the modern world, including the example of Imelda Marcos and her architect, Leandro V. Locsin.

Commonly cited examples in the Philippines 
Buildings cited as examples of the Marcos era edifice complex include the buildings of the Cultural Center of the Philippines complex (conceived in 1966), the San Juanico Bridge (conceived in 1969), the Philippine International Convention Center (conceived in 1974), the Philippine Heart Center (conceived in 1975), the National Arts Center in Los Baños, Laguna (inaugurated in 1976), Coconut Palace (conceived in 1978), the Lung Center of the Philippines (conceived in 1981), the National Kidney and Transplant Institute (conceived in 1981), the Philippine Plaza Hotel (conceived in 1976), and Terminal 1 of Manila International Airport (completed in 1981).

The 1976 Tondo evictions which were part of the "Tondo Urban Renewal Project" and the deaths of construction workers at the Manila Film Center are also counted as signs of Imelda's having the complex.

The "designer hospitals" were particularly criticized as wrongly prioritised healthcare projects, draining public funds for the benefit of only a handful of patients, while basic health institutions, such as the Quezon Institute for Tuberculosis Patients, were overflowing and underfunded.

Destruction of Mt. Sungay 
One other example, which was never completed, was the Palace in the Sky complex in Tagaytay, Cavite, which Imelda intended to host the visit of US President Ronald Reagan. The construction of the palace, which was suddenly stopped when Reagan canceled his visit, drastically changed the landscape of the Cavite highland, because preparations for the construction meant leveling the geographically distinct Mount Sungay to about half of its former height.

When the People Power Revolution in 1986 overthrew the Marcoses, the new government renamed the palace as the People's Park in the Sky, opening it to the public to help demonstrate the excesses of the ousted regime.

In popular culture

The term was mentioned in the contemporary 1974 disaster film The Towering Inferno in which the developer of the ill-fated skyscraper was maneuvering with a U.S. Senator to secure federal funding for similar buildings around the United States.

In episode 39 of the 1990s television sitcom Home Improvement, titled "Love is a Many Splintered Thing," main character Tim Taylor's next door neighbor, Wilson, jokes that Tim has "an edifice complex" due to the fact that he is a handyman who enjoys building things.

The term is again mentioned in the 1997 James Bond movie Tomorrow Never Dies when, after being captured by Stamper and taken to the CMGN tower in Saigon (from which Carver has hung a large banner featuring his face), he remarks "Another Carver Building, if I didn't know any better I'd say he developed an edifice complex"

See also 
 Marcos mansions

References 

Presidency of Ferdinand Marcos
1970s neologisms